Zé Ramalho canta Luiz Gonzaga is the third tribute album by Brazilian solo artist Zé Ramalho. This time, he pays a tribute to his influence Luiz Gonzaga, one of the most well-known artist of the forró music.

Track listing

Personnel 

 Zé Ramalho  – acoustic guitar on tracks 1-5, lead vocals on all tracks, viola on tracks 2, 8, 10
 Luiz Gonzaga – lead vocals on track 12
 Dominguinhos – lead vocals on track 6, accordion on tracks 6, 7, 9, 10
 Lú Bahia – electric guitar on track 6
 Lalá – electric guitar on track 6
 Manassés – electric guitar on track 9
 Heraldo do Monte – electric guitar on track 9
 João Lyra – acoustic guitar on tracks 3, 9, 11, viola on track 11, electric guitar on track 11
 Robertinho de Recife – bass on tracks 4, 5, electric guitar on tracks 7, 9, cavaquinho on track 10
 Bozó – Cavaco on track 11
 Chico Guedes – bass on tracks 1, 2, 4, 8
 André Neiva – bass on track 3
 Toninho – bass on track 6
 Jacaré – bass on track 7
 Jorjão – bass on track 9
 Jamil Joanes – bass on track 9
 Tony Dias – bass on track 11
 Luiz Antônio – keyboard on tracks 3, 7, bass on track 10
 Luiz Antônio Gomes – keyboard on track 9
 Gustavo Schröeter – drums on tracks 2, 4, 8
 Wellington – drums on track 6
 Renato Massa – drums on track 7 
 Fernando Pereira – drums on track 9
 Jurim Moreira – drums on track 9
 Téo Lima – drums on track 9
 Adelson – drums on track 11
 Zé Gomes – rhythm on track 1, percussion on tracks 1, 2, 4, 5, 8, 10
 Zé Leal – percussion on tracks 2, 4, 8, 10,
 Firmino – percussion on tracks 3, 7, 9
 Paulinho "He-Man" – percussion on track 7
 Ivo – percussion on track 11
 Ivinho – percussion on track 11
 Mingo Araújo – percussion and triangle on track 9
 Duane – zabumba on tracks 5, 10
 Diô de Araújo – zabumba on track 6
 Durval – zabumba on tracks 9, 11
 Zazum – triangle on track 6
 Dodô de Moraes – accordion on track 1 and keyboard on track 1
 Genário – accordion on tracks 2, 4, 8
 Aldrin de Caruaru – accordion on track 5
 Genro  – accordion on track 6
 Sivuca – accordion on track 9
 Oswaldinho – accordion on track 9
 Genaro – accordion on track 11
 Proveta – alto saxophone and tenor saxophone on track 6
 Spoky – flute and saxophone on track 11
 Carlos Malta – flute on track 11
 Léo Ortiz – violin on track 3
 Paquitas, Ângela Mattos, Andréa Sorvetão, Zé Henrique – Choir on track 7
 Wanini and Geno – Choir on track 11

2009 albums
Zé Ramalho albums
Luiz Gonzaga tribute albums